Fresno Area Express (FAX), is a public transportation operator in Fresno, California. The system has over 100 buses, 1,606 bus stops, and 18 routes as of August 2022. FAX fixed routes run as far south as Malaga to Valley Children's Hospital in the north. Lines also run as far east as Fowler Avenue in Clovis, and as far west as Hayes Avenue near Highway 99 in western Fresno.

FAX has paratransit operations called Handy Ride. Handy Ride is operated by a private contractor. FAX offers free transfers as well as wheelchair lifts and bike racks on all buses.

History 

The public transportation system in Fresno started in January 1889 with horse-drawn streetcars. By 1901, lines had been established on Fulton, Fresno, and Mariposa Streets, which merged together into the Fresno City Railway Company. The company was renamed the Fresno Traction Company in 1903 as employees began the process of converting the lines to electric streetcars. These electric streetcars operated on approximately 42 miles of track by the mid-1920s.

In 1939, the streetcar system was purchased by National City Lines, known for its role in the General Motors streetcar conspiracy. The company renamed the system Fresno City Lines, and like the other lines it purchased around the nation, National City Lines started to replace Fresno's rail system with buses and all streetcar operations ended on May 20, 1939.

The city of Fresno took control of Fresno City Lines in 1961, renaming it Fresno Municipal Lines. The system would be renamed Fresno Transit in 1969 and received its current name, Fresno Area Express or FAX, in 1989.

In 2001, FAX started the process of converting its fleet to be fueled by compressed natural gas (CNG), a process that was expected to take about 10 years.

In January 2017, the agency introduced FAX15, a frequent bus service, on the Shaw Avenue and Cedar Avenue corridors. On these lines, buses arrive every 15 minutes on weekdays between 6 am and 6 pm. Bus stops along the FAX15 lines were improved in 2022 and 2023.

FAX Q, a frequent bus service that the agency brands as bus rapid transit, opened on February 19, 2018. The  line operates on the Blackstone and Ventura/Kings Canyon transit corridors and cost  to build.

The agency started the process of converting to a zero tailpipe emission fleet in 2021, with the introduction of two battery-electric buses in late 2021. The agency also plans to purchase hydrogen fuel cell buses. FAX expects to purchase its last CNG-fueled buses in 2027, and retire them by 2040.

Routes 
Accurate .

Transit Centers 
Fresno Area Express has two primary transit centers, hubs where passengers can transfer between several routes. The Manchester Transit Center is located on the west side of Blackstone Avenue and is served by routes 1, 28 and 41, additionally, it is the location of the FAX Customer Service Center. The Downtown Transit Center is located at Courthouse Park and is served by routes 1, 22, 26, 28, 32, 34 and 38, along with the Fresno County Rural Transit Agency's Coalinga, Orange Cove, Southeast and Westside routes, along with Visalia Transit's V-LINE service.

Fleet 
, Fresno Area Express has a fleet of 126 buses, with 100 needed for service on weekdays and 73 on weekends. The buses in the spare fleet are used when necessary to cover for buses that need to be taken out of service for maintenance.

The fleet primarily consists of 40-foot buses powered by CNG-fueled engines, but there are also three 29-foot buses for use on low-ridership routes and nine battery electric buses as the agency begins its transition to a zero tailpipe emissions fleet.

References 

Bus transportation in California
Public transportation in Fresno County, California
Transportation in Fresno, California
Transit agencies in California